The Berlin ePrix is an annual race of the single-seater, electrically powered Formula E championship, held in Berlin, Germany. It was first raced in the 2014–15 season.

Circuits

Tempelhof Airport

The 2015 Berlin ePrix took place at a temporary circuit at Tempelhof Airport, that was 2.469 km long with 17 turns. But because Tempelhof Airport was used for housing refugees in 2016, the second edition could not take place there. The race returned to Tempelhof Airport in 2017 with an updated layout that features 10 turns and 2.250 km long. It is the only circuit on the calendar to feature old concrete that offers low grip and high tyre wear, as used in the airport, long turns, an indoor tunnel and a wide circuit.

The 2020 edition of the event is planned to have 3 doubleheader races, with each doubleheader being on a different circuit variation. One race ran on the normal layout, one on a reverse layout, and the final one ran with a changed section around Turn 5 and 6. This was due to the COVID-19 Pandemic that shut down Formula E between February and June.

Karl-Marx Allee/Strausberger Platz
Since Tempelhof Airport was used for housing refugees in 2016, a street circuit in downtown Berlin around Strausberger Platz was created for the 2016 Berlin ePrix. The circuit is 1.927 km in length and features 11 turns, with the pit lane located on Karl-Marx-Allee.

Results

Repeat winners (drivers)

Notes

References

 
Berlin
Auto races in Germany
Sports competitions in Berlin
Motorsport in Berlin
Recurring sporting events established in 2015
2015 establishments in Germany